Theobald Butler, 1st Viscount Butler of Tulleophelim (died December 1613), was an Irish peer.

Birth and origins 
Theobald was the son of Sir Edmund Butler by the Honourable Eleanor Eustace, daughter of Rowland Eustace, 2nd Viscount Baltinglass. James Butler, 9th Earl of Ormonde, was his grandfather, and Sir Thomas Butler, 1st Baronet, of Cloughgrenan, his younger brother. He was raised to the Peerage of Ireland as Viscount Butler of Tulleophelim, in the County of Carlow. In 1605 he was appointed Governor of County Carlow.

Viscount 
Butler was created Viscount Butler of Tulleophelim by letter patent on 4 August 1603.

Marriage 
Lord Butler of Tulleophelim married his first cousin Elizabeth Butler, daughter of Thomas Butler, 10th Earl of Ormond, in 1603. There were no children from the marriage. He died in December 1613, when the viscountcy became extinct. The dowager Viscountess Butler of Tulleophelim married as her second husband Richard Preston, 1st Earl of Desmond. She died in October 1628.

Death and Timeline 
Viscount Butler of Tulleophelim died in January 1613.

Notes and references

Notes

Notes

References 
 
  – Bass to Canning (for Butler of Tulleophelim)
 

1613 deaths
Theobald
Viscounts in the Peerage of Ireland
Year of birth unknown
Peers of Ireland created by James I